Aspistomella is a genus of picture-winged flies in the family Ulidiidae.

Species
 Aspistomella heteroptera
 Aspistomella lobioptera

References

Ulidiidae